Mary Curtis may refer to:
Mary C. Curtis, American journalist
Mary Curtis Richardson (née Curtis, 1848–1931). American impressionist painter
Mary Curtis Verna (née Curtis, 1927–2009), American operatic soprano
Mary Curtis (TV executive), head of UTV Ireland
Mary Louise Curtis (1876–1970), founder of the Curtis Institute of Music in Philadelphia